Pioneer High School is located in the city of Anand, Gujarat, India. It consists Kindergarten through 12th standard education. While 11th and 12th standard only contains Arts and Commerce field. This school is a private school aided by the major funds.

High schools and secondary schools in Gujarat
Education in Anand district